Sona Heiden is an Indian actress, entrepreneur and film producer. She was crowned Miss South India in the year 2002.

Personal life

Sona Heiden was born in Chennai, Tamil Nadu, India. Her father is an Anglo Indian and her mother is a Tamil. She did her schooling in Chennai at the Lusarus Road convent school. She has completed her graduation in commerce from the Annamalai University. Later, she completed her Fashion & Designing Marketing Advanced Diploma from Madurai Kamaraj University. She has two siblings and both are younger to her. She has a production house in Columbia and many fashion stores in the name of UNIQ across the globe.

Filmography

As actress

Production

Television

References

External links
 

Indian beauty pageant winners
Actresses in Telugu cinema
Living people
Actresses in Tamil cinema
Year of birth missing (living people)
Actresses in Malayalam cinema
21st-century Indian actresses
Indian film actresses
Actresses from Chennai
Indian women film producers
Film producers from Chennai
Tamil film producers
Businesswomen from Tamil Nadu
Actresses in Kannada cinema